Antonio de Alzega, O.F.M or Antonio de Alcega (1555 – 13 May 1610) was a Roman Catholic prelate who served as Bishop of Coro (1604–1610).

Biography
Antonio de Alzega was born in Azpeitia, Spain in 1555 and ordained a priest in the Order of Friars Minor.
On 25 September 1604, he was selected by the King of Spain as Bishop of Coro and confirmed by Pope Clement VIII on 12 December 1605.
In 1606, he was consecrated bishop.
He served as Bishop of Coro until his death on 13 May 1610.

References

External links and additional sources
 (for Chronology of Bishops) 
 (for Chronology of Bishops) 

17th-century Roman Catholic bishops in Venezuela
Bishops appointed by Pope Clement VIII
1610 deaths
Franciscan bishops
1555 births
Roman Catholic bishops of Coro